Paul Bello Amedume (born February 28, 2003) is a Canadian soccer player who plays as a defender for Pacific FC.

Early life
Amedume began playing youth soccer with Edmonton Internazionale SC, followed by the St. Nicholas Soccer Academy. He began training with the BTB Academy in 2013. In August 2017, he joined the Vancouver Whitecaps Residency Program. In 2019, he played with the FC Edmonton U20 in the Alberta Major Soccer League.

Club career
Amedume began training with Pacific FC of the Canadian Premier League in October 2021, eventually signing a developmental contract with the club on October 26. He made his debut on the same day, in a substitute appearance against FC Edmonton.

On February 28, 2022, Amedume was loaned to FC Dallas reserve team North Texas SC with an option to buy, rejoining recently departed Pacific manager Pah-Modou Kah. He scored his first goal on May 8 against the Tacoma Defiance.

In December 2022, Pacific announced Amedume would return to the club ahead of the 2023 CPL season.

International career
Amedume was named to the 60-man provisional Canadian U-20 team for the 2022 CONCACAF U-20 Championship.

Career statistics

References

2003 births
Living people
Soccer players from Toronto
Canadian soccer players
Canadian people of Nigerian descent
Soccer players from Edmonton
Association football midfielders
Canadian Premier League players
Vancouver Whitecaps Residency players
FC Edmonton players
Pacific FC players
North Texas SC players
Canadian expatriate soccer players
Expatriate soccer players in the United States
Canadian expatriate sportspeople in the United States
MLS Next Pro players